The Trail of the Lonesome Pine is a 1916 American silent drama film directed by Cecil B. DeMille. It is based on the 1908 novel and the 1912 play of the same name by Eugene Walter. Charlotte Walker reprised her role from the Broadway production. A copy of the 1916 film survives in the archives of George Eastman House.

Cast
 Charlotte Walker as June Tolliver
 Thomas Meighan as Jack Hale
 Earle Foxe as Dave Tolliver
 Theodore Roberts as Judd Tolliver

Other adaptions

The novel was first adapted for the screen in 1914, and starred Dixie Compton. Another version released in 1923 starred Mary Miles Minter and is now considered a lost film. The novel was adapted for the fourth time in 1936, an early Technicolor version starring Fred MacMurray, Sylvia Sidney, and Henry Fonda.

References

External links
 
 

1916 films
1916 romantic drama films
1916 Western (genre) films
American romantic drama films
American black-and-white films
American films based on plays
Famous Players-Lasky films
Films directed by Cecil B. DeMille
Films set in Virginia
Films based on American novels
Films based on adaptations
Silent American Western (genre) films
1910s American films
Silent romantic drama films
Silent American drama films
1910s English-language films